Our Lady of Providence High School is a coed Catholic high school in Clarksville, Indiana, in the Roman Catholic Archdiocese of Indianapolis. The school first opened on September 12, 1951.

Providence was recognized as a Blue Ribbon School of Excellence by the United States Department of Education in 2000. It also receives accreditation from the Indiana Department of Education and the North Central Association of Colleges and Secondary Schools. It is 9-12 grades.

Athletics
The Providence Pioneers are an independent school.  The school colors are navy blue and white.  The following IHSAA sanctioned sports are offered:

Baseball (boys)
State champion - 2016, 2021
Basketball (girls & boys)
Boy’s State Champion-2022
Cross Country (girls & boys)
Football (boys)
Golf (girls & boys)
Soccer (girls & boys)
Girl's state champion - 2011
Boy’s State Champion-2020
Softball (girls
Swimming & Diving (girls & boys)
Tennis (girls & boys)
Track & Field (girls & boys)
Volleyball (girls)
State champion - 2013, 2014, 2015, 2022
Wrestling (boys)

See also
 List of high schools in Indiana

References

External links
Our Lady of Providence Junior-Senior High School
Archdiocesan Office of Catholic Education
Indiana Department of Education School Profile

Roman Catholic Archdiocese of Indianapolis
Educational institutions established in 1951
Catholic secondary schools in Indiana
Private high schools in Indiana
Education in Clarksville, Indiana
Sisters of Providence of Saint Mary-of-the-Woods
Schools in Clark County, Indiana
Private middle schools in Indiana
1951 establishments in Indiana